James William Norton Smith (1846 – 12 January 1911) was an Australian politician.

Smith was born in Nailsworth in Gloucestershire in 1846. In 1885 he was elected to the Tasmanian House of Assembly, representing the seat of Wellington. He served until 1886. He died in 1911 in Flowerdale.

References

1846 births
1911 deaths
Members of the Tasmanian House of Assembly